The Chicago mayoral election of 1885 saw Democratic incumbent Carter Harrison Sr. win an unprecedented fourth term, receiving a majority of voter and narrowly defeating Republican Sidney Smith by a less than half-percent margin of victory.

The election was held on April 7.

Campaign
Democratic Mayor Harrison was challenged by Republican challenger, Sidney Smith, a judge of the Superior Court of Cook County. Before being nominated at the city's Republican convention, Smith had declared they would not actively seek to run and would only run if nominated by the Republican Party's convention.

Republicans exploited controversies which had tarnished the image of Harrison's administration. Unsubstantiated allegations of voter fraud and patronage had been key controversies throughout his mayoralty. In February 1885, a month before the election, a grand jury found Michael Cassius McDonald's right-hand man Joseph Mackin and others with connections to Harrison guilty of election fraud in the 1884 elections. Despite the fact that no personal wrongdoing on Harrison's part was involved in these charges, the charges against Mackin and others compounded with the preexisting rumors relating to Harrison to foster a public sentiment that challenged Harrison's popularity.

Citizens groups led by the city's elite forged a strong campaign effort against Harrison, taking advantage of the voter fraud charges against those connected to Harrison.

Harrison lost the support of many liberal German voters that had previously voted for him.

Results

Less than 50% of the city's German population voted for Harrison.

References

Mayoral elections in Chicago
Chicago
Chicago
1880s in Chicago